The Great Western Railway (GWR) 2301 Class or Dean Goods Class is a class of British 0-6-0 steam locomotives.

Swindon railway works built 260 of these goods locomotives between 1883 and 1899 to a design of William Dean. The 2301 class broke with previous GWR tradition in having inside frames only and changes were made in the boiler design during the period that they were being built. The first twenty engines were originally domeless though all were provided with domed boilers in due course. They were numbered 2301–2360 and 2381–2580 (2361–2380 were of the 2361 class, which were similar visually but had outside frames).

Construction

Rebuild as 3901 class
In 1907, twenty Dean Goods (numbers 2491-2510) were rebuilt as 2-6-2T 'Prairie' tank locos, forming the new 3901 class numbers 3901-3920.

War Service

In 1917, 62 engines were taken over by the Railway Operating Division and sent to France. 46 of these engines returned to England in the early summer of 1919, but the other 16 had been sent on to Salonika at the beginning of 1918. Two of these engines, nos 2308 and 2542, were sold to the Ottoman railways and renumbered 110 and 111. No 111 was withdrawn in September 1929, but 110 lasted until the 1950s. Of the 14 engines remaining at Salonika, five were written-off and the other nine returned to England in April 1921.

At the outbreak of the Second World War, the War Department requisitioned 100 of these engines from the GWR and the GWR had to hastily reinstate some engines that had been recently withdrawn. The requisitioned engines were fitted with Westinghouse brakes and 10 were fitted with pannier tanks and condensing gear. All were painted black with their WD numbers painted on. In December 1940, the War Department requisitioned a further 8 engines. The War Department renumbered the locomotives 93 to 200.

At the time of the German invasion of France, 79 of these engines had been shipped to France. Some of the engines were destroyed in the retreat to Dunkirk whilst the remainder were used on the French railways by the German occupation forces. After the war, between 22 and 26 engines were sent to China under UNRRA auspices, and 30 were returned to the UK, but were deemed unfit for service and scrapped. No.2435 (WD no.188) was sent to France in 1940 and was used in Silesia and then in Austria between 1944 and 1948 when it was claimed by the Russians before being handed back to the Austrians in 1952. Two further engines, nos. 2419 and 2526 (WD nos. 106 and 132). One locomotive, no.2489 (WD no.142), was in eastern Germany at the end of the War and was taken into Deutsche Reichsbahn (East Germany) stock as 53 7607; it was withdrawn in 1955. The remaining engines are assumed to have been scrapped.

Of the engines that remained in England, most of them worked at War Department and Ordnance depots around the country, though in 1943, 6 were shipped to Tunisia and thence to Italy.

Some locomotives of the class have the unusual distinction of being shipped overseas in both World Wars. 32 of the 108 locomotives requisitioned during the Second World War had been previously requisitioned during the First World War, and of those 32, 24 were again sent overseas.

British Railways

Fifty-four locomotives passed to British Railways in 1948, mostly being used on Welsh branch lines due to their light axle loads. They were progressively replaced by new BR standard class 2 2-6-0 engines, and no 2538 was the last to be withdrawn in May 1957.

Preservation

One locomotive, no. 2516 (built 1897), has survived into preservation. 2516 is currently a static exhibit at Swindon Steam Railway Museum, with the tender displayed far behind; visitors consequently have a clear view into the driving cab (see pictures).

Models
Three companies have released models of the Dean Goods class:

Oxford Rail in 2017 in Great Western (no 2475 & 2534), RoD Khaki (no 2308) and British Railways Black (no 2409) liveries.

Mainline Model Railways made a Dean Goods class in GWR Green (no 2516) and BR black (no 2538) in 1983.

Hornby Model Railways have released R2064/A/B/C (nos 2468, 2322, 2526, 2579), R2210 (no 2579) and R2275/A (nos 2322 & 2538)

References

Sources

External links

 Rail UK database

2301
0-6-0 locomotives
War Department locomotives
Railway Operating Division locomotives
Railway locomotives introduced in 1883
Standard gauge steam locomotives of Great Britain
Standard gauge locomotives of Austria
Standard gauge locomotives of China
Standard gauge locomotives of France
Standard gauge locomotives of Greece
Standard gauge locomotives of Italy
Standard gauge locomotives of Poland
Standard gauge locomotives of Tunisia
Standard gauge locomotives of Turkey
Steam locomotives of Austria
Steam locomotives of China
Steam locomotives of France
Steam locomotives of Greece
Steam locomotives of Italy
Steam locomotives of Poland
Steam locomotives of Tunisia
Steam locomotives of Turkey
Freight locomotives